Tropical Village is a miniature amusement theme park in Ayer Hitam, Batu Pahat District, Johor, Malaysia.

The replicas of the structures are built within this 32 acres theme park that allow visitors to have another memorable experience. The park is divided into four sections: Landmarks, Leisure Corner, Playground and Agricultural Enclosure.

The Landmarks Section is a garden with a wonderful famous landmark in the whole world. There's a section of Malay Culture like Kompang sculpture, Kuda Kepang, Mini Malaysia such as Petronas Towers, Fort A famosa and Mini World.

The Leisure Corner is especially appealing to younger visitors with its Haunted House, House of Mirrors and Dinosaur Train among other attractions. The Playground with its Oriental Island, Pet Corner and Garden of the Shy Monkey is also a favourite with little ones. The park has dorms for visitors who want to stay overnight and continue the fun the next day.

List of major attractions in the Mini World, Tropical Village

Europe & USA region

Leaning Tower of Pisa - Italy
Statue of Liberty - USA
Colosseum - Italy
Eiffel Tower - France
Hollywood Sign - USA
Windmills - Netherlands
The Little Mermaid (statue) - Denmark
Atomium - Belgium

Asia region

Great Wall of China - China
Sigiriya Lion Rock - Sri Lanka
Wat Pho Reclining Buddha - Thailand
Borobudur - Indonesia
Merlion - Singapore
Taj Mahal - India
Kuwait Towers - Kuwait
Giza & Spinx - Egypt

Other famous replicas
Moai sculpture - Easter Island
Japan kokeshi - Japan
Olmec head - Mexico
Budai - Chinese God
Bruce Lee Sculpture - Hong Kong
Jeju Island Sculpture - South Korea

Transportation
The theme park is accessible by bus from Larkin Sentral (2, 888) in Johor Bahru.

See also

 List of tourist attractions in Malaysia

References

External links

Amusement parks in Johor
Batu Pahat District
Miniature parks